Moscow’s 850th Anniversary Pageant; Saint George, The Bell and The Dragon, opened Moscow’s week-long anniversary celebrations on 5 September 1997.  It was staged in Red Square in front of St Basil’s Cathedral and was broadcast live throughout Russia and the Commonwealth of Independent States countries and in major broadcast markets elsewhere.

The pageant featured a cast of a thousand (plus horses), with Russian classical, choral and folk music as well as dance. Large-scale graphics were used to depict scenes from Moscow’s past.

The event was commissioned by the mayor of Moscow, Yuri Luzhkov, with the British producer and impresario Tony Hollingsworth being brought in to executive-produce the show.  The creative director was Andrei Konchalovsky, the renowned Russian film director.  The show was watched by a specially-invited live audience of 6,000.

The Russian and CIS television sales were handled by Luzhkov, owner of the Russian channel Central TV.  Hollingsworth received 50 per cent of his fee from the City of Moscow, with the rest coming from television sales to other countries.

Rights in the event are held by Tribute Inspirations Limited.

Artists 
 Evgeny Kissin
 Makvala Kasrashvili
Pelageya Khanova
 Stanislav Varki
 Valery Gergiev
 Yuri Bashmet
 Chamber of Moscow Soloists
 Choral Academy of TV and Radio
 State Academy of Classical Ballet
 Russian National Orchestra
 Joint Chorus Academy of Choral Art and Ostkano TV Children’s Choir
 State Academy Kuban Cossack Choir

Folk bands 
 Velikorossi
 Dmitry Pok
 Russichi
 Nerekhtshiye Rozhechniki

Military bands 
 Red Army Band
 Military Folk Band of Moscow Region
 Military Folk Band of Alexandrov
 Military Historical Association of Russia and CIS
 Acrobatic Circus Troupe Russhichi
 Ali Bek Horses

Music festivals in Russia
Russian folk music